The Ministry of Youth, Sport and Arts, formerly known as the Ministry of Sport, Youth and Child Development, is a ministry in Zambia. It is headed by the Minister of Youth, Sport and Arts.

The Child Development function was part of the Ministry of Gender until 2016. The Arts function was part of the Ministry of Tourism until 2021.

List of ministers

References

Sports
 
Zambia